The Mount Allison Mounties women's ice hockey program represents the Mount Allison University in the Atlantic University Sport conference of U Sports.

History
In 2011, Andrea Switalski made program history, becoming the first Mounties player to win a major U Sports (known as Canadian Interuniversity Sport back then) Award. The recipient of the Marion Hilliard Award, said award recognizes a player who best exhibits outstanding balance between athletic achievement, academics, and community service. As a side note, Switalski had also won the Mounties Chris Young Memorial Award in 2008, recognizing the team's Rookie of the Year.

Hired on July 30, 2020, Lucrèce Nussbaum, a former member of the Switzerland women's national ice hockey team and participant in ice hockey at the 2010 Winter Olympics, was hired as head coach for the Mounties.

Former Mounties captain Kenzie Lalonde became the first female ever to do television play by play for a Quebec Major Junior Hockey League (QMJHL) game on television.  Of note, she called the March 14, 2021 game between Halifax and Charlottetown for Eastlink.

Season-by-season record 
{| class="wikitable"
|-
| style="background:#fea;"|Won Championship
| style="background:#dfd;"|<small>'Lost Championship</small>
| style="background:#d0e7ff;"|Conference Champions
| style="background:#fbb;"|League Leader
|-
|
|
|
|
|}

Team captains
 2015–16: Kenzie Lalonde
 2016–17: Kenzie Lalonde
 2017–18: Heather Richards
 2018–19: Heather Rae Richards
 2019–20:

Season team scoring champion

RivalsUniversity of New BrunswickInternational
 Abby Beale : 2019 Winter Universiade

 Terry Rhindress, : 2019 Winter Universiade Assistant Coach

Awards and honours
 Andrea Switalski, 2010–11 Marion Hilliard Award
AUS Awards
 Zach Ball, 2010–11 AUS Coach of the Year
 Andrea Switalski, 2010–11 AUS Student-Athlete Community Service Award
AUS Most Sportsmanlike Player
 2011–12: Ashlynn Somers
 2012–13: Ashlynn Somers
 2013–14: Courtney King
 2018–19: Heather Richards
AUS All-Stars
 2009-10 AUS Second Team All-Stars: Meghan Corley-Byrne, Mount Allison

AUS All-Rookies

Team AwardsChris Young Memorial Award (Rookie of the Year)
 2007–08: Andrea Switalski, Defense
 2014–15: Kelsey MacDougall
 2015–16: Heather Richards
 2016–17: EmmaRae Murphy
 2018–19: Samantha Jarron
 2019-20: Lauren SteeleMost Valuable Player''
 2014–15: Kenzie Lalonde
 2015–16: Keri Martin 
 2016–17: Jennifer Bell
 2018–19: Heather Richards
 2019-20: Bianca Zak

University Awards
 2020 Mount Allison Donald Cameron Manager’s Award: Laura Hopper
 2018 Mount Allison Overall University Rookie of the Year (female): Abby Beale
 2017 Bubsy Grant Award: Zach Ball Head Coach

Outstanding Senior Female Athlete
 2020 Mount Allison Outstanding Senior Female Athlete: Rhiannon Ford
 2015 Mount Allison Outstanding Scholar Athlete Award: Kate O'Brien
 2016 Mount Allison Outstanding Senior Female Athlete: Amanda Volcko
 2017 Mount Allison Outstanding Senior Female Athlete: Kelsey MacDougall

Gigi Hicks Sportsmanship Award
 2015 Gigi Hicks Sportsmanship award: Amanda Volcko
 Heather Richards: 2019 Gigi Hicks Sportsmanship award

References 

Sport in New Brunswick
 U Sports women's ice hockey teams
Ice hockey teams in New Brunswick
Mount Allison University
Women in New Brunswick